Svenstrup & Vendelboe is the self-titled debut album by the Danish DJ and producer duo Svenstrup & Vendelboe. It was released October 14, 2013, on the :labelmade: and disco: wax. The album contains four platinum-selling singles "I Nat", "Dybt Vand", "Glemmer Dig Aldrig", "Where Do We Go From Here" and more recently "Hvor Ondt Det Gør" . The album peaked in Danish charts on 7 position.

Track listing

Chart performance

Release history

References 

2013 debut albums
Svenstrup & Vendelboe albums